The 1960 LPGA Tour was the 11th season since the LPGA Tour officially began in 1950. The season ran from January 15 to September 25. The season consisted of 23 official money events. Mickey Wright won the most tournaments, six. Louise Suggs led the money list with earnings of $16,892.

There were no first-time winners in 1960, the only season in LPGA history that this happened.

The tournament results and award winners are listed below.

Tournament results
The following table shows all the official money events for the 1960 season. "Date" is the ending date of the tournament. The numbers in parentheses after the winners' names are the number of wins they had on the tour up to and including that event. Majors are shown in bold.

Awards

References

External links
LPGA Tour official site

LPGA Tour seasons
LPGA Tour